Dahti Tsetso is a Tłı̨chǫ Dene environmentalist from Canada. She serves as deputy director of the Indigenous Leadership Initiative and was former director of lands and resources for Dehcho First Nations.

Early life and education 
Tsetso was born in Fort Simpson (Łı́ı́dlı̨ı̨ Kų́ę́), Northwest Territories. She holds a bachelor of science in environmental conservation sciences and a bachelor of arts degree in Native Studies from the University of Alberta, and a Diploma in Indigenous Language Revitalization from the University of Victoria.

Environmental advocacy 
Tsetso worked for Dehcho First Nations for more than 10 years. While serving as the resource management coordinator for her First Nation, she finalized agreements between Dehcho First Nations and Environment and Climate Change Canada for the Edéhzhíe Protected Area, Canada's first Indigenous Protected and Conserved Area. Located on the Horn Plateau, the 14,249-square-kilometre region, will be managed cooperatively by the Dehcho First Nations and the Canadian Wildlife Service. Tsetso said this ground-breaking agreement "will give us some capacity to start addressing the goals of our communities and approaching protection in ways that make sense to them, that helps our communities approach stewardship in a meaningful way."

In her current role as deputy director of the Indigenous Leadership Initiative, Tsetso works to collaborate with Indigenous Nations on stewardship and guardians programs, advising on creation of Indigenous Protected and Conserved Areas, and establishing funding for conservation efforts.

Within her First Nation, Tsetso developed the Dehcho K’éhodi Stewardship and Guardians program.  Dehcho K'éhodi translates as "taking care the Dehcho" in Dene Zhatié.

Educational programs 
The Dehcho K’éhodi Stewardship and Guardians program includes annual Dehcho Youth Ecology and Traditional Knowledge camps, which Tsetso led for several years. Dene elders and Western scientists teach Dehcho youth about environmental issues and help non-Indigenous scientific researchers build relationships with the Dehcho First Nation.

External links 
 Dehcho K’éhodi Stewardship Program

References 

Living people
Year of birth missing (living people)
First Nations activists
People from the Northwest Territories
University of Alberta alumni
University of Victoria alumni
Tłı̨chǫ
Dene people
21st-century First Nations people
People from Fort Simpson